Orthomegas pehlkei is a species of beetle in the genus Orthomegas of the family Cerambycidae. It is found in Colombia and Peru.

References

Beetles described in 1904
Prioninae